(born April 11, 1972, in Muroran, Hokkaidō) is a Japanese football referee.

She became a first class referee in 1999 and began officiating games in the L. League and was placed on the FIFA list of international referees in 2002.

Her first international tournament was the 2002 FIFA U-19 Women's World Championship in which she officiated two games including the third place play-off. Following her performance in the 2004 FIFA U-19 Women's World Championship, in which she refereed a Quarter final match, Oiwa was promoted to the Japan Football League.

She became the first female referee to officiate in the 84th Nationwide Highschool soccer championship conference on January 22, 2006, and then refereed the final at the 2006 AFC Women's Championship. Selected by FIFA to officiate in the 2007 FIFA Women's World Cup in China, she refereed two games and was fourth official in the Final between Germany and Brazil.

References

1972 births
Japanese football referees
Women association football referees
FIFA Women's World Cup referees
People from Muroran, Hokkaido
Living people
Sportspeople from Hokkaido